This is a list of seasons played by Cliftonville in Northern Irish and European football.

Seasons

Seasons